The Buster Meat Market, located at about 250 Main Ave. in Challis in Custer County, Idaho was a historic building built in c.1897.  It was listed on the National Register of Historic Places in 1980.

It was a one-story stone building with a galvanized iron front manufactured by the Mesker Bros. of St. Louis, Missouri.  It was built for George McGowan, a merchant, and was rented to William Buster until Buster outright purchased the building.  The building was considered the finest building in Challis for a number of years.

The building no longer existed in 2008.

Another NRHP-listed stone building, the Challis Cold Storage, located at about 300 Main Ave., collapsed in the 1983 Borah Peak earthquake.

Notes

References

Commercial buildings on the National Register of Historic Places in Idaho
Buildings and structures completed in 1897
Custer County, Idaho